Eleutherococcus sieboldianus, the five-fingered aralia or fiveleaf aralia, is a species of flowering plant in the family Araliaceae. It is native to Anhui province in China, and has been introduced to Korea, Japan and the United States. A variegated form is available which only reaches .

References

sieboldianus
Endemic flora of China
Flora of Anhui
Plants described in 1939